The county of Cambridgeshire is divided into six districts. The districts of Cambridgeshire are Cambridge, South Cambridgeshire, Huntingdonshire, Fenland East Cambridgeshire and Peterborough (unitary).

As there are 488 Grade II* listed buildings in the county they have been split into separate lists for each district.

 Grade II* listed buildings in Cambridge
 Grade II* listed buildings in South Cambridgeshire
 Grade II* listed buildings in Huntingdonshire
 Grade II* listed buildings in Fenland
 Grade II* listed buildings in East Cambridgeshire
 Grade II* listed buildings in Peterborough (unitary)

See also
 Grade I listed buildings in Cambridgeshire

References

 
Lists of Grade II* listed buildings in Cambridgeshire